Leo Frankowski (February 13, 1943 – December 25, 2008) was an American writer of science fiction novels.

Life
Frankowski was born in Detroit, Michigan to parents of Polish descent. Prior to his writing career, he was a successful engineer. Leo held multiple patents, including his most popular item, Formital, a stamped aluminum product for use as a base for plastic auto body filler. Formital was carried exclusively for many years by the Pep Boys chain of auto parts stores.

Frankowski lived in  Russia for four years with his wife and adopted teenage daughter, but at the time of his death, he had separated from them and had moved back to the United States. He died in Lake Elsinore, California.

Writings
Though he had tinkered with short science fiction for several years, Leo's writing career began in earnest in the early 1980s when he was invited to join what became the National Science Fiction Writer's Exchange, a now-defunct Detroit-area group founded by Guy Snyder, and whose membership included Lloyd Biggle, Ted Reynolds and future published author Ann Tonsor Zeddies.  Members read manuscripts aloud, which were then critiqued; from the beginning, Leo's stories related to time travel were well received by the membership.  Most of these meetings were audio-taped, and those tapes were retained by Snyder.

Encouraged by the positive responses, Leo quickly wrote his first novel, initially titled The Polish Engineer.  The book landed at Del Rey Books, and the publisher offered him a multi-book contract. Retitled The Cross Time Engineer, it became the first book in his Conrad Stargard series, in which his Polish background is particularly evident.

Two other series were written partially in collaboration with Dave Grossman; alone, he also wrote the stand-alone novels Fata Morgana and Copernick's Rebellion.

Frankowski's most recent work again featured Conrad Stargard.  He wrote Lord Conrad's Crusade in collaboration with Rodger Olsen, which his then-publisher Baen rejected 'for "bad writing" (an explanation Frankowski doubted). Baen also terminated its contracts for other upcoming titles. Frankowski published the novel himself, and promised another Stargard book which would conclude the series. His death apparently precluded completion of this volume.

Political views
Frankowski stated that most of his fans were "males with military and technical backgrounds," and that his detractors were "mostly Feminists, Liberals, and Homosexuals." Frankowski admitted that anyone who self-identifies with the latter categories would be unlikely to enjoy his fiction.

In the preface to the 1990 Lord Conrad's Lady, Frankowski included a facetious remark: "Any overt sexism and male chauvinism noticed in this work is totally the fault of Bill Gillmore, and all complaints should be addressed to him at the Dawn Treader Bookshop of Ann Arbor, Mich."

Bibliography

Conrad Stargard series
In the Conrad Stargard series, a twentieth-century Polish engineer travels back in time to thirteenth-century Poland, where he introduces modern technology, defeats and annihilates historic enemies of Poland and makes Poland the dominant European power for centuries to come.  It consists of the following books. Rubber and Time Machine feature the same setting and some of the same characters, but are not 'main sequence' books.

The Cross Time Engineer (1986)
  Twentieth-century Polish engineer Conrad Schwartz is accidentally and mysteriously dumped in thirteenth-century Poland.  He becomes friendly with the saintly Father Ignacy, who convinces him he is indeed in an earlier era.  He meets a number of minor characters who figure in later books, such as the boatman Tadaos, and winds up working for Count Lambert, a relative of the Duke who rules over much of Poland.
The High-Tech Knight (1989)
  Conrad, now using the name Stargard because his correct name sounds too German, works to bring Poland into some advanced technology in order to meet the imminent threat of the 1241 Mongol invasion.
The Radiant Warrior (1989)
  Conrad creates an army of 150,000 highly-trained soldiers.  Twentieth Century techniques disturb Thirteenth Century society.
The Flying Warlord (1989)
  Count Lambert forces Conrad to divert his efforts into creating an air force.  The Mongols invade, with tens of thousands dead on all sides.
Lord Conrad's Lady (1990)
  Lady Francine, a French woman known as one of the two most beautiful women in Poland (the other lives with Conrad, but as an heretical Muslim can't or won't marry him) maneuvers Conrad into marrying her.
Conrad's Quest for Rubber (1998):  Conrad sends an expedition to South America, with disastrous effects due to unique diseases.
Conrad's Time Machine (2002)
  Conrad does not appear in this.  This book explains the invention of the time machine and the people who control its use, incidentally providing explanations for their occasional interference in Conrad's behalf.  Note:  A sequel was planned and rough-outlined in 2005 (Not yet published).
Lord Conrad's Crusade (2005)
 Conrad goes on vacation and ends up seeing the slave trade from the wrong side of the bars. Of course he escapes—only to end up an unwilling crusader!
Conrad's Last Campaign (2014)
 Frankowski's posthumously published finale to the Conrad Stargard series. The Mongols are overdue, so Conrad takes the war to them.

Note:  Four additional Conrad Stargard Novels were roughly outlined/rough drafted, with notes and brainstorming ideas, but were and are not yet published.
Additionally, there was to be a separate tie-in with Leo's first novel Copernick's Rebellion to the "Adventures of Conrad Stargard".

Two omnibus editions of this series have been published by Baen Books:

 Conrad Stargard: Radiant Warrior (2004)
  Contains The Cross-time Engineer, The High Tech Knight and The Radiant Warrior.
 Conrad's Lady (2005)
  Contains The Flying Warlord, Lord Conrad's Lady and Conrad's Quest for Rubber.

New Kashubia
 A Boy and His Tank (1999)
 The War with Earth (2003) (with Dave Grossman)
 Kren of the Mitchegai (2004) (with Dave Grossman)

Two-Space
The Two-Space War (2004) (with Dave Grossman)

This series was continued by Grossman in collaboration with Bob Hudson with The Guns of Two-Space (2007)

Stand-alone novels
Copernick's Rebellion (1987)
Fata Morgana (1999)

References

External links
 Frankowski's reasons for going to Russia (via archive.org)
 Frankowski's current publisher, Great Authors Online
 

1943 births
2008 deaths
20th-century American novelists
21st-century American novelists
American expatriates in Russia
American male novelists
American science fiction writers
American people of Polish descent
20th-century American male writers
21st-century American male writers